The 2021 NCAA Division I Women's Swimming and Diving Championships were contested from March 17-20, 2021 at the Greensboro Aquatic Center in Greensboro, North Carolina at the 39th annual NCAA-sanctioned swim meet to determine the team and individual national champions of Division I women's collegiate swimming and diving in the United States.

Hosted by the NC State Wolfpack of North Carolina State University and the Greensboro Sports Foundation, the meet was the first NCAA Swimming & Diving Championship to be held since 2019, after the 2020 meet was canceled due to the COVID-19 pandemic. Stringent guidelines were imposed at the meet to comply with public health standards in the face of the continuing pandemic.

The Virginia Cavaliers won the meet-- their first NCAA Swimming & Diving title and also the first in the Atlantic Coast Conference. NC State finished second, and Texas third. Maggie MacNeil of Michigan was named the CSCAA Women's Swimmer of the Year, and Sarah Bacon of Minnesota was named Women's Diver of the Year. Todd DeSorbo of Virginia was named the CSCAA Women's Team Coach of the Year and Minnesota's Wenbo Chen was named the Women's Diving Coach of the Year.

Team standings 

 (H) = Hosts
 (DC) = Defending champions
 Full results

Swimming Results

Diving Results

Modifications due to Covid-19 

 No spectator seating was offered due to North Carolina public health restrictions (no exceptions for family/friends)
 No athletes were permitted on deck unless they were competing or using a warmup pool
 Team seating was socially-distanced- located in the observation stands at the Greensboro Aquatic Center
 Relay events were conducted as timed finals with an empty lane in between each team
 Judges were removed from the deck area to improve social distancing. A high-speed camera system was in place to review relay exchanges
 Restrictions were tightened around alternate athletes:
 Swimmers forced to withdraw from the meet due to a positive Covid-19 test could only be replaced within 24 hours of the selection announcement
 Uninvited relay participants were required to swim in at least one relay in the meet, and were not permitted to fill alternate slots if a scratch occurred for any reason. Penalty for non-compliance was a disqualification of the team's final relay
 Teams received dedicated practice times and were not permitted in the facility outside of those times
 Teams and athletes not competing in a session were not permitted in the facility
 Teams could identify up to two alternate athletes not competing in a session who would be permitted to enter the facility
 Teams only received two deck passes for swim coaches, and one deck pass for dive coaches. Coaches were not permitted to be on deck unless one of their athletes was competing at that time, and were expected to leave the deck at the end of the event
 Team recovery areas were not available within the Greensboro Aquatic Facility. Sports Medicine staff were permitted to operate within the neighboring Greensboro Coliseum
 Teams were tested for Covid-19 every other day over the course of the competition via nasal testing
 At the Women's meet, there were no confirmed positive tests

See also 

 List of college swimming and diving teams

References 

NCAA Division I Women's Swimming and Diving Championships
NCAA Division I Swimming And Diving Championships